David Timor Copoví (born 17 October 1989) is a Spanish professional footballer who plays as a central midfielder for SD Huesca.

Club career
Born in Carcaixent, Valencian Community, Timor was a product of Valencia CF's youth ranks. He made his senior debut with the reserves, playing two seasons in the Segunda División B and suffering relegation in the second.

Timor signed for CA Osasuna in summer 2010, but spent the vast majority of his first year with the B team also in the third division. He made his debut with the main squad on 23 April 2011, playing the last ten minutes of a 2–0 La Liga away defeat against eventual champions FC Barcelona. He scored his first goal in the competition on 30 September 2012, contributing a penalty to the 4–0 home win over Levante UD.

On 16 July 2013, Timor joined Segunda División club Girona FC in a season-long loan. On 25 July of the following year, he agreed to a three-year contract with Real Valladolid also in the second tier.

Timor moved to CD Leganés on 26 January 2016, on a deal until 2018. He scored twice in 17 appearances, as they achieved top-flight promotion for the first time ever.

On 1 September 2017, Timor returned to Girona after signing a three-year contract. The following 31 August, he put pen to paper on a four-year deal with UD Las Palmas of division two.

Timor joined Getafe CF on a three-year contract on 29 August 2019, after becoming a free agent. On 21 January 2022, having featured sparingly during the campaign, he terminated his contract with the club and signed a two-and-a-half-year deal with SD Huesca just hours later.

Career statistics

Club

References

External links

1989 births
Living people
People from Ribera Alta (comarca)
Sportspeople from the Province of Valencia
Spanish footballers
Footballers from the Valencian Community
Association football midfielders
La Liga players
Segunda División players
Segunda División B players
Valencia CF Mestalla footballers
CA Osasuna B players
CA Osasuna players
Girona FC players
Real Valladolid players
CD Leganés players
UD Las Palmas players
Getafe CF footballers
SD Huesca footballers